The Saratov Oblast Duma is the regional parliament of Saratov Oblast, a federal subject of Russia. A total of 45 deputies are elected for five-year terms.

History
The 2017 Saratov Oblast Duma elections took place on the 10th September 2017, and the first meeting of the 6th convocation took place on the 19th September.

In February 2022, Nikolai Bondarenko was impeached from the Saratov Oblast Duma by a vote from other deputies on the grounds of improperly declaring donations to his YouTube channel.

On April 4, 2022, the powers of the deputy from  A Just Russia Zinaida Samsonova were terminated.

Elections

5th convocation (2012–2017)

6th convocation (2017–2022)

7th convocation (2022–2027)

Notes

References

Saratov Oblast
Politics of Saratov Oblast